Asangaon may refer to:

 Asangaon railway station, in Thane district of Maharashtra, India
 Asangaon, Dahanu, a village in Palghar district of Maharashtra, India
 Asangaon Budruk, a village in Palghar district of Maharashtra, India